The 2017 Pittsburgh Panthers football team represented the University of Pittsburgh in the 2017 NCAA Division I FBS football season. The Panthers were led by third-year head coach Pat Narduzzi and played their home games at Heinz Field. They were a member of the Coastal Division of the Atlantic Coast Conference (ACC). This was Pitt's fifth season as a member of the ACC. They finished the season 5–7, 3–5 in ACC play to finish in a three-way tie for fourth place.

Previous season 
The Panthers finished the 2016 season 8–5, 5–3 in ACC play to finish in a three-way tie for second place in the Coastal Division. The Panthers received an invite to the Pinstripe Bowl at Yankee Stadium where they lost to Northwestern 31–24.

Recruiting

Position key

Recruits

The Panthers signed a total of 24 recruits.

Coaching staff

Roster

Schedule
The Panthers schedule was released on January 24, 2017.

Game summaries

Youngstown State

at Penn State

Oklahoma State

at Georgia Tech

Rice

at Syracuse

NC State

at Duke

Virginia

North Carolina

at Virginia Tech

Miami (FL)

2018 NFL draft

References

Pittsburgh
Pittsburgh Panthers football seasons
Pittsburgh Panthers football